The Marsh River is a  tidal river in Newcastle, Maine, in the United States. It is a tributary of the Sheepscot River.

The Marsh River is formed at the confluence of Deer Meadow Brook and the outlet of Sherman Lake in the western corner of Newcastle and flows west, north, and west again to join the Sheepscot at the town boundary between Newcastle and Wiscasset.

See also
List of rivers of Maine

References

Maine Streamflow Data from the USGS
Maine Watershed Data From Environmental Protection Agency

Rivers of Maine
Rivers of Lincoln County, Maine